Todd Gifford May (born May 13, 1955) is a political philosopher who writes on topics of anarchism, poststructuralism, and post-structuralist anarchism. More recently he has published books on existentialism and moral philosophy. He is currently Class of 1941 Memorial Professor of Philosophy at Clemson University.

Career 
In 1989, May received a doctorate at Pennsylvania State University in continental philosophy. For the first part of his career, he focused on French philosophy, before turning to moral and political philosophy. May has been teaching moral and political philosophy for over thirty years, beginning as a graduate instructor at Penn State before becoming a visiting assistant professor at the Indiana University of Pennsylvania. May has been teaching at Clemson since 1991, and he currently teaches as the Class of 1941 Memorial Professor of Philosophy. May also teaches philosophy to incarcerated people.

Art academic Allan Antliff described May's 1994 The Political Philosophy of Poststructuralist Anarchism as "seminal", and credited the book with introducing "post-structuralist anarchism", later abbreviated as "post-anarchism". May has published works on major poststructuralist philosophers, including Gilles Deleuze and Michel Foucault.  He also wrote books on more general topics accessible to the general reader, including Death, Our Practices, Our Selves, or, What It Means to Be Human, Friendship in an Age of Economics: Resisting the Forces of Neoliberalism, A Significant Life: Human Meaning in a Silent Universe, A Fragile Life: Accepting Our Vulnerability.

May, along with Pamela Hieronymi, was a philosophical advisor to the NBC television show The Good Place. Together they appeared as cameos in the final episode.

Personal life 
May has three children, the youngest of whom majored in philosophy at university.

Bibliography 
Between Genealogy and Epistemology (1993). University Park: Pennsylvania State University Press. . 
The Political Philosophy of Poststructuralist Anarchism (1994). University Park: Pennsylvania State University Press. .
Reconsidering Difference (1997). University Park: Pennsylvania State University Press. . 
Our Practices, Our Selves, or, What It Means to Be Human (2001). University Park: Pennsylvania State University Press. . 
Operation Defensive Shield (2003). Sydney: Pluto Press. . Written in collaboration with Muna Hamzeh.
The Moral Theory of Poststructuralism (2004). University Park: Pennsylvania State University Press. . 
Gilles Deleuze (2005). Cambridge: Cambridge University Press. . 
Philosophy of Foucault (2006). Montreal: McGill-Queen's University Press. . 
The Political Thought of Jacques Ranciere: Creating Equality (2008). Edinburgh: Edinburgh University Press. .
Death (2008). Acumen Publishing. .
Friendship in an Age of Economics: Resisting the Forces of Neoliberalism (2014). New York: Lexington Books. .
A Significant Life: Human Meaning in a Silent Universe (2015). Chicago: University of Chicago Press. .
Nonviolent Resistance: A Philosophical Introduction (2015). Cambridge: Polity Books. .
A Fragile Life: Accepting Our Vulnerability (2017). Chicago: University of Chicago Press. .
A Decent Life: Morality for the Rest of Us (2019). Chicago: University of Chicago Press. .
Exploring the Philosophy of Death and Dying: Classical and Contemporary Perspectives, Chapter 21: Death, Mortality, and Meaning (December 31, 2020, 1st Edition). Publisher: Routledge.

References

Further reading

External links
" Gay Rights Outlook Improves in South", a letter to the editor by May published in The New York Times on 1998-07-07

1955 births
Living people
American anarchists
Continental philosophers
American political philosophers
Postanarchists
Poststructuralists
Clemson University faculty
Writers from New York City
Foucault scholars
Pennsylvania State University alumni
Deleuze scholars
20th-century American philosophers
21st-century American philosophers
The Good Place